Mel Tormé Live at the Fujitsu–Concord Festival 1990 is a 1991 live album by the American jazz singer Mel Tormé, recorded in Tokyo.

Track listing 
 "A Shine on Your Shoes" (Howard Dietz, Arthur Schwartz) – 3:19
 "Looking at You"/"That Face"/"Look at That Face" (Irving Berlin)/(Lew Spence, Alan Bergman)/(Leslie Bricusse, Anthony Newley) – 4:34
 "A Nightingale Sang in Berkeley Square" (Eric Maschwitz, Manning Sherwin) – 4:45
 "Wave" (Antônio Carlos Jobim) – 5:45
 "Stardust" (Hoagy Carmichael, Mitchell Parish) – 6:02
 "Don'cha Go 'Way Mad"/"Come to Baby Do" (Jimmy Mundy, Al Stillman, Illinois Jacquet)/(Inez James, Sidney Miller) – 3:51
 "The Christmas Song"/"Autumn Leaves" (Mel Tormé, Bob Wells)/(Joseph Kosma, Johnny Mercer, Jacques Prévert) – 6:59
 "You're Driving Me Crazy"/"Moten Swing" (Walter Donaldson)/(Bennie Moten) – 6:21
 "Sent for You Yesterday (And Here You Come Today)" (Count Basie, Eddie Durham, Jimmy Rushing) – 4:26
 "Swingin' the Blues" (Basie, Durham, Jon Hendricks) – 4:40
 "Tokyo State of Mind" (Billy Joel, Tormé) – 5:27

Personnel 
 Mel Tormé - vocals
 John Campbell - piano
 Bob Maize - double bass
 Donny Osborne - drums
Frank Wess–Harry Edison big band
 Frank Wess - alto saxophone
 Joe Newman - trumpet

References 

Mel Tormé live albums
1991 live albums
albums produced by Carl Jefferson
Concord Records live albums